Rasika Sunil Dhabadgaonkar (born 3 August 1992) is an Indian model, television and film actress who mainly works in Marathi industry. She made her film debut with Poshter Girl (2016) and Television debut with Mazhya Navryachi Bayko (2016).

Early life 
She was born in Akola, Maharashtra. She did her BMM Degree from K. G. Joshi Bedekar College, Thane. She is a trained classical dancer and holds a Diploma in Bharatnatyam. She has also done Sangeet Visharad in Indian classical music. Thereafter, she participated in various competitions like Youth Festivals and Rajya Natya Spardhas. She participated in 52nd Natya Spardha and Won first prize for her play Love Aaj Kal. Later, she went do commercial plays.

Personal life 
Rasika married Aditya Bilagi on 18 October 2021.

Career 
She started her career with commercial plays. She participated in the Lux Jhakaas Heroine Contest on 9X TV. In 2016, she did a lavani in Kashala Lavato Naat in the Marathi film Poshter Girl. In the same year, she bagged role of "Shanaya" in Mazhya Navryachi Bayko. She also appeared in the Bus Stop in which she played a Youth girl. She also made her performance in Tum Bin Mohe a music video as an Actor, Singer and Director also. She made her debut in International short film named Wild Geese.

Filmography

Films

Television

Album Song

Awards and nominations

References

External links 
 Rasika Sunil on IMDb
 Rasika Sunil on Instagram

Living people
1992 births
Actresses in Marathi cinema
People from Akola
People from Maharashtra by occupation
Actresses from Maharashtra